Hybris (Ancient Greek: Ὕβρις means 'hubris') was a spirit (daemon) of insolence, violence, and outrageous behaviour. In Roman mythology, the personification was Petulantia who reflected the Greek conception of hubris.

Family 
Hybris was the daughter of the primordial gods, Nyx (Night) and Erebus (Darkness) or of Aether (Air) and Gaea (Earth). In some accounts, her mother was Dyssebia (Impiety). According to Apollodorus, she and Zeus had Pan together.

Aeschylus' account 
I have a timely word of advice: arrogance (hybris) is truly the child of impiety (dyssebia), but from health of soul comes happiness, dear to all, much prayed for.

Hyginus' account 
From Nox/ Nyx (Night) and Erebus [were born]: Fatum/ Moros (Fate), Senectus/ Geras (Old Age), Mors/ Thanatos (Death), Letum/ Ker (Dissolution), Continentia (Moderation), Somnus/ Hypnos (Sleep), Somnia/ Oneiroi (Dreams), Amor/ Eros (Love)--that is Lysimeles, Epiphron (Prudence), Porphyrion, Epaphus, Discordia/ Eris (Discord), Miseria/ Oizys (Misery), Petulantia/ Hybris (Wantonness), Nemesis (Envy), Euphrosyne (Good Cheer), Amicitia/ Philotes (Friendship), Misericordia/ Eleos (Compassion), Styx (Hatred); the three Parcae/ Moirai (Fates), namely Clotho, Lachesis and Atropos; the Hesperides.

Notes

References 

 Aeschylus, translated in two volumes. 2. Eumenides by Herbert Weir Smyth, Ph. D. Cambridge, MA. Harvard University Press. 1926. Online version at the Perseus Digital Library. Greek text available from the same website.
Gaius Julius Hyginus, Fabulae from The Myths of Hyginus translated and edited by Mary Grant. University of Kansas Publications in Humanistic Studies. Online version at the Topos Text Project.

Greek goddesses
Personifications in Greek mythology
Children of Nyx
Divine women of Zeus
Daimons
Violence